NK Mladost Prelog is a football club based in the town of Prelog, Croatia.

Honours 

 Treća HNL – South:
Winners (1): 2001–02

Football clubs in Croatia
Football clubs in Međimurje County
Association football clubs established in 1920
1920 establishments in Croatia
Prelog, Croatia